Alte Donau  is a station on  of the Vienna U-Bahn. It is located in the Donaustadt District. It opened in 1982.

References

External links 
 

Buildings and structures in Donaustadt
Railway stations opened in 1982
Vienna U-Bahn stations
1982 establishments in Austria
Railway stations in Austria opened in the 20th century